Anton Paar GmbH is an Austrian company based in Graz that develops, produces and sells analytical instruments for laboratories and process analytical technology. It also provides automation and robotics. The company specializes in the production of instruments for measuring density, concentration, dissolved carbon dioxide, and in the fields of rheometry and material characterization. Many of Anton Paar's customers are beer and soft drink manufacturers as well as companies in the food, chemicals, and pharmaceutical industries.

History
The company was founded in 1922 by locksmith Anton Paar. He trained his daughter, Margareta Platzer, in the 1920s to become a locksmith. She and Otto Kratky developed the Kratky X-ray small-angle camera.

In 1963, Platzer's son-in-law Ulrich Santner took over the management of the company. In 1997, his son-in-law Friedrich Santner joined the management. Since 2002 he is the sole managing director.

In 2003, the family business was incorporated into a charitable foundation.

On February 12, 2018, Anton Paar acquired Quantachrome Instruments, a manufacturer of scientific instruments.

In 2020, Friedrich Santner's sons became part of the management. Jakob Santner took over the position as CTO and Dominik Santner as COO; Friedrich Santner remains CEO.

References

Instrument-making corporations
Laboratory equipment manufacturers
Research support companies
Companies based in Graz
Austrian brands
Austrian companies established in 1922
Manufacturing companies established in 1922